The Gen. Mason J. Young House, also known as the William Boyd House, is a historic house and connected farm complex at 4 Young Road in Londonderry, New Hampshire.  With a building history dating to 1802, it is a well-preserved example of a New England connected farmstead.  The house was listed on the National Register of Historic Places in 1986.

Description and history
The Gen. Mason J. Young House is located just off Londonderry's commercial area of New Hampshire Route 102, at the corner of Young Road and Cross Road. It is a -story wood-frame structure with a gable roof and a central chimney.  It is five bays wide and three deep with a columned portico (c. 1900) sheltering its front entry, and a single-story porch (dating to the mid-19th century) extending along the side. The interior has well-preserved period woodwork. A two-story wing extends to the rear of the house, which is further extended by a series of sheds connecting the house to a carriage house and dairy barn.

The main house is reported by family accounts to have been built in 1802, on a farm that was in active use since 1757. The land was first settled by Mason Boyd, and the house was built by William Boyd. Originally a subsistence farm, it was transformed into a dairy farm in the mid-19th century, delivering milk and other products to Boston by railroad. In the 20th century a shift began toward the production of apples. The property was registered as a Bicentennial Farm in 1976, reflecting over 200 years of ownership by a single family.

See also
National Register of Historic Places listings in Rockingham County, New Hampshire

References

Houses on the National Register of Historic Places in New Hampshire
Houses completed in 1802
Houses in Rockingham County, New Hampshire
National Register of Historic Places in Rockingham County, New Hampshire
Londonderry, New Hampshire